Crassispira semigranosa is a species of sea snail, a marine gastropod mollusk in the family Pseudomelatomidae.

Description
The length of the shell attains 17 mm.

The whorls are concave round the upper part, nodosely ribbed in the middle and granulated beneath. They are whitish, encircled round the lower part with an orange band.

Distribution
This marine species occurs off  the Virgin Islands,  the Grenadines and off Brazil

References

 Reeve, L. 1846. Monograph of the genus Pleurotoma Conchologia Iconica 1 pls. 34-40

External links
 
 

semigranosa
Gastropods described in 1846